Greece will compete at the 2022 European Championships in Munich from August 11 to August 22, 2022.

Medalists - Athletics

Medalists - Rowing

Competitors
The following is the list of number of competitors in the Championships:

Athletics

Gymnastics

Greece has entered five male and five female athletes.

Men

Qualification

Women

Qualification

Rowing

Men

Women

Sport climbing

Boulder

Speed

References

2022
Nations at the 2022 European Championships
European Championships